Else-Marie Lindgren (born 1949) is a Swedish Christian democratic politician. She has been a member of the Riksdag since 2002.

In February 2009 Lindgren controversially suggested the Prime Minister of Sweden should end speeches with the phrase "God bless Sweden" in the manner of the President of the United States.

References

External links
Else-Marie Lindgren at the Riksdag website

1949 births
21st-century Swedish women politicians
Living people
Members of the Riksdag 2002–2006
Members of the Riksdag 2006–2010
Members of the Riksdag from the Christian Democrats (Sweden)
Women members of the Riksdag